Heaviside–Lorentz units (or Lorentz–Heaviside units) constitute a system of units and quantities that extends the CGS with a particular set of equations that defines electromagnetic quantities, named for Oliver Heaviside and Hendrik Antoon Lorentz. They share with the CGS-Gaussian system that the electric constant  and magnetic constant  do not appear in the defining equations for electromagnetism, having been incorporated implicitly into the electromagnetic quantities.

The Heaviside–Lorentz unit system, like the International System of Quantities upon which the SI system is based, but unlike the CGS-Gaussian system, is rationalized, with the result that there are no factors of  appearing explicitly in Maxwell's equations. That this system is rationalized partly explains its appeal in quantum field theory: the Lagrangian underlying the theory does not have any factors of  when this system is used. It is often used in relativistic calculations, and are used in particle physics. They are particularly convenient when performing calculations in spatial dimensions greater than three such as in string theory.

Motivation 

In the mid-late 19th Century, electromagnetic measurements were frequently made in either the so-called electrostatic (ESU) or electromagnetic (EMU) systems of units. These were based respectively on Coulomb's and Ampere's Law. Use of these systems, as with to the subsequently developed Gaussian CGS units, resulted in many factors of  appearing in formulas for electromagnetic results, including those without circular or spherical symmetry.

In 1893 Heaviside wrote

Length–mass–time framework 

As in the Gaussian system, the Heaviside–Lorentz system uses the length–mass–time dimensions. This means that all of the units of electric and magnetic quantities are expressible in terms of the units of the base quantities length, time and mass.

The  quantity  describing a charge is then  larger than the corresponding Gaussian quantity. There are comparable relationships for the other electromagnetic quantities (see below).

The commonly used set of units is the called the SI, which defines two constants, the vacuum permittivity and the vacuum permeability. These can be used to convert  units to their corresponding Heaviside–Lorentz values, as detailed below.

Comparison of Heaviside–Lorentz with other systems of units 

This section has a list of the basic formulas of electromagnetism, given in the SI, Heaviside–Lorentz, and Gaussian systems.
 is the polarization density,
 is the magnetization,
 is charge density,
 is current density,
 is the speed of light in vacuum,
 is the electric potential,
 is the magnetic vector potential,
 is the Lorentz force acting on a body of charge  and velocity ,
 is the permittivity,
 is the electric susceptibility.
 is the magnetic permeability,
and
 is the magnetic susceptibility.

Maxwell's equations 

, is the same in all systems of units, but the electric field is
 in the  system,

Other basic laws

Dielectric and magnetic materials 

It is assumed here for simplicity that the medium is homogeneous, linear, isotropic, and nondispersive, so that the susceptibilities are constants.

By contrast, the electric susceptibility  is dimensionless in all the systems, but has different numeric values for the same material:

The same statements apply for the corresponding magnetic quantities.

Advantages and disadvantages of Heaviside–Lorentz units

Advantages 

 The formulas above are clearly simpler in  units compared to either  or  units.
 Removing the explicit  from the Gauss law makes it clear that the inverse-square force law arises by the  field spreading out over the surface of a sphere. This allows a straightforward extension to other dimensions. For example the case of long, parallel wires extending straight in the  direction can be considered a two-dimensional system. Another example is in string theory, where more than three spatial dimensions often need to be considered.
 The equations are free of the constants  and  that are present in the  system.

The below points are true in both  and  systems, but not .

 The electric and magnetic fields  and  have the same dimensions in the  system, meaning it is easy to recall where factors of  go in the Maxwell equation.
There are no factors of  that need to be inserted when assembling the tensor out of the three-dimensional fields. Similarly,  and  have the same dimensions and are the four components of the 4-potential.

Disadvantages 

 Despite Heaviside's urgings, it proved difficult to persuade people to switch from the established units. He believed that if the units were changed, "[o]ld style instruments would very soon be in a minority, and then disappear ...". Persuading people to switch was already difficult in 1893, and in the meanwhile there have been more than a century's worth of additional textbooks printed and voltmeters built.

 Heaviside–Lorentz units, like the Gaussian CGS units by which they generally differ by a factor of about 3.5, are frequently of rather inconvenient sizes. The ampere (coulomb/second) is reasonable unit for measuring currents commonly encountered, but the ESU/s, as demonstrated above, is far too small. The Gaussian CGS unit of electric potential is named a statvolt. It is about 300 V, a value which is larger than most commonly encountered potentials. The henry, the  unit for inductance is already on the large side compared to most inductors, the  unit is 12 orders of magnitude larger.

 A few of the Gaussian CGS units have names; none of the Heaviside–Lorentz units do.

Some textbooks on classical electricity and magnetism have been written using Gaussian CGS units, but recently some of them have been rewritten to use  units. Outside of these contexts, including for example magazine articles on electric circuits,  and  units are rarely encountered.

Translating expressions and formulas between systems

To convert any expression or formula between the SI, Heaviside–Lorentz or Gaussian systems, the corresponding quantities shown in the table below can be directly equated and hence substituted. This will reproduce any of the specific formulas given in the list above.

As an example, starting with the equation

and the equations from the table

moving the factor across in the latter identities and substituting, the result is

which then simplifies to

Notes

References 

Special relativity
Electromagnetism
Hendrik Lorentz